Nižná is a village and municipality in Piešťany District in the Trnava Region of western Slovakia.

History
In historical records the village was first mentioned in 1532.

Geography
The municipality lies at an altitude of 184 metres and covers an area of 8.051 km2. It has a population of about 517 people.

References

External links
 
 
https://web.archive.org/web/20070513023228/http://www.statistics.sk/mosmis/eng/run.html

Villages and municipalities in Piešťany District